The 2015–16 Princeton Tigers men's basketball team represented Princeton University during the 2015–16 NCAA Division I men's basketball season. The Tigers, led by fifth year head coach Mitch Henderson, played their home games at Jadwin Gymnasium and were members of the Ivy League. They finished the season 22–7, 12–2 in Ivy League play to finish in second place. They were invited to the National Invitation Tournament where they lost in the first round to Virginia Tech.

Previous season
The Tigers finished the season 16–14, 9–5 in Ivy League play to finish in third place.

Awards and accomplishments
Spencer Weisz earned second-team All-Ivy League recognition in 2016. As a junior, he served as a tri-captain (along with Mike Washington, Jr. and Steven Cook) of the 2015–16 team, led the Ivy League in assist-to-turnover ratio (2.8), and was 2nd in the league in assists-per-game (3.9), 4th in assists (113), 6th in 3-point field goals (63), and 8th in defensive rebounds (129).

Departures

Recruiting

Recruiting class of 2016

Roster

Schedule

|-
!colspan=8 style="background:#000000; color:#FF6F00;"| Regular Season

|-
!colspan=9 style="background:#000000; color:#FF6F00;"| National Invitation Tournament

See also
2015–16 Princeton Tigers women's basketball team

References

Princeton Tigers men's basketball seasons
Princeton
Princeton
Princeton Tigers men's basketball
Princeton Tigers men's basketball